The 1999 Air Force Falcons football team represented the United States Air Force Academy in the 1999 NCAA Division I-A football season. The team was led by 16th-year head coach Fisher DeBerry and played its home games in Falcon Stadium. It competed in its first season in the newly formed Mountain West Conference and finished with a 6–5 record overall and a 2–5 record in conference games.

Schedule

Rankings

References

Air Force
Air Force Falcons football seasons
Air Force Falcons football